Viewfinder is Pullman's second album, the follow-up to 1998's Turnstyles & Junkpiles.

Background 
Recorded, mixed and edited by Ken Brown in the summer 2000 at Soma Electronic Music Studio in Chicago, Illinois, Viewfinder was released on August 21, 2001, by Thrill Jockey. The album was digitally mastered by Roger Seibel at SAE Mastering, Phoenix, Arizona.

Track listing 
All songs written and performed by Chris Brokaw, Ken Brown, Curtis Harvey and Doug McCombs, with Tim Barnes, except as indicated.

Personnel 

 Chris Brokaw – Nylon String Guitar, Electric Guitar, Slide Guitar, Electric Bass Guitar, Percussion, Whistling 
 Ken Brown – Acoustic Guitars, Electric Guitars, E-Bow 
 Curtis Harvey – Acoustic Guitars, Electric Guitars, Electric Bass Guitar, Bazouki, Fender Bass VI, Accordion, Mountain Dulcimer 
 Doug McCombs – Acoustic Bass Guitars, Electric Bass Guitars, Double Bass, Nylon String Guitar, Electric Guitar, Clavioline, Dobro, Lap Steel 
 
with 
 
 Tim Barnes – Drum Kit, Percussion, Sea Shanty 
 
Additional personnel 
 
 Ken Brown – Producer 
 Curtis Harvey – Photography and Design 
 Sheila Sachs – Additional Layout

References

External links 
 Allmusic, Review of Pullman's Viewfinder 
 All About Jazz, Review of Pullman's Viewfinder

Pullman (band) albums
2001 albums